Susie Power-Reeves (born 26 March 1975) is an Australian middle- and long-distance runner.

, Power-Reeves holds the current women's record for the Sydney City to Surf course, set in 2001. She also holds the Australian women's 1000m time (2:39.4, set in 1993) and several Australian women's under 20 records:
 her above 1000m time
 Mile run (4:32.73, set in 1992)
 2000m (5:50.47, set in 1994)

Power-Reeves won the women's event in the Sydney City to Surf in 2001 and 2002, and the Sydney Half Marathon in 2003. Her Sydney Half Marathon time is currently the third fastest women's time in the history of the event.

References 
Cool Running: Susie Power interview

1975 births
Living people
Australian female middle-distance runners
Australian female long-distance runners
Athletes (track and field) at the 2002 Commonwealth Games
Commonwealth Games medallists in athletics
Commonwealth Games bronze medallists for Australia
Goodwill Games medalists in athletics
Competitors at the 2001 Goodwill Games
20th-century Australian women
21st-century Australian women
Medallists at the 2002 Commonwealth Games